Stresemann's bird-of-paradise is a bird in the family Paradisaeidae that is an intergeneric hybrid between a Queen Carola's parotia and greater lophorina.

History
Only one female specimen is known of this hybrid, held in the Berlin Natural History Museum, coming from Mount Hunstein in the Sepik district of north-eastern New Guinea. It was first identified as a female Carola's Parotia in 1923 and later, in 1934, described as a subspecies of the Superb Bird of Paradise; it is named for its original identifier and later describer, German ornithologist Erwin Stresemann.

Notes

References
 

Hybrid birds of paradise
Birds of New Guinea
Intergeneric hybrids